Somchai Maiwilai (born 27 June 1970) is a Thai football manager, who is the current assistant manager Thai League 1 club Ratchaburi Mitr Phol.

Honours
Ratchaburi FC
2011 Regional League Division 2 Central & Eastern Region Champions : 2011 
2012 Thai Division 1 League Champions : 2012
2012 Thai League Cup Runner-up  : 2012
2019 Thai FA Cup Runner-up : 2019

References

Living people
1970 births
Somchai Maiwilai
Somchai Maiwilai
Somchai Maiwilai